Cindy Landry (born 1972) is a Canadian former pair skater. With Lyndon Johnston, she is the 1989 World silver medallist and 1990 Canadian national champion. After placing 9th at the 1990 World Championships, they both turned professional.

Earlier in her career, Landry skated with Sylvain Lalonde on the novice and junior levels.

Results

With Lalonde

With Johnston

References
https://web.archive.org/web/20080408215222/http://www.skatecanada.ca/en/events_results/results/archives/SkateCanadaResultsBook-Volume2-1974-current.pdf
http://www.pairsonice.net/profileview.php?pid=34

Canadian female pair skaters
Living people
1972 births
World Figure Skating Championships medalists